Ravenhill or Raven Hill may refer to:

 Ravenhill, Belfast, an area of Belfast, Northern Ireland, UK
 Ravenhill Stadium, a rugby stadium in Belfast
 Ravenhill, Swansea, an area of Swansea, Wales, UK
 Ravenhill (mansion), the Philadelphia mansion of William Weightman
 Ravenhill (band), an American rock band
 Ravenhill (surname)
 Raven Hill Discovery Center, a museum in Michigan, United States